Balinese is a Malayo-Polynesian language spoken by 3.3 million people on the Indonesian island of Bali, as well as Northern Nusa Penida, Western Lombok, Eastern Java, Southern Sumatra, and Sulawesi. Most Balinese speakers also know Indonesian. The Bali Cultural Agency estimated in 2011 that the number of people still using the Balinese language in their daily lives on the Bali Island is under 1 million. The language has been classified as "not endangered" by Glottolog.

The higher registers of the language borrow extensively from Javanese: an old form of classical Javanese, Kawi, is used in Bali as a religious and ceremonial language.

Classification 
Balinese is an Austronesian language belonging to the Malayo-Polynesian branch of the family. Within Malayo-Polynesian, it is part of the Bali–Sasak–Sumbawa subgroup. Internally, Balinese has three distinct varieties; Highland Bali, Lowland Bali and Nusa Penida.

Demographics 
According to the 2000 census, Balinese language is spoken by 3.3 million people in Indonesia, mainly concentrated on the island of Bali and the surrounding areas. 

In 2011, the Bali Cultural Agency estimated that the number of people still using the Balinese language in their daily lives on the Bali Island does not exceed 1 million, as in urban areas their parents only introduce the Indonesian language or even English as a foreign language, while daily conversations in the institutions and the mass media have disappeared. The written form of the Balinese language is increasingly unfamiliar and most Balinese people use the Balinese language only as a means of oral communication, often mixing it with Indonesian in their daily speech. But in the transmigration areas outside Bali Island, the Balinese language is extensively used and believed to play an important role in the survival of the language.

Phonology

Vowels

However,  is usually pronounced  when it ends a word, and  occurs also in prefixes ma-, pa- and da-.

Consonants

Depending on dialect, the phoneme  is realized as a voiceless alveolar or retroflex stop. This is in contrast with most other languages in western Indonesia (including Standard Indonesian), which have a dental  patterning with an otherwise alveolar phoneme series.

Stress
Stress falls on the last syllable.

Vocabulary

Registers 
Even though most of the basic vocabulary in Balinese and Indonesian are of Austronesian and Sanskrit origin, many cognates in both languages sound quite different. Balinese has different registers depending on the relationship and status of those speaking: low, middle, and high.  contains many loanwords from Sanskrit and Javanese (specifically Old Javanese) which reflect the fifteenth century usage spoken Old Javanese. The common mutations in inherited Balinese words are:

 First, mutation r into h of initial r, intervocalic r, and final r
 Second, h into ø, everywhere except final consonant

However, these mutations are not expressed by the High Balinese, thus this infer high Balinese was loanwords from Sanskrit and (Old) Javanese. These loanwords are identical in sound with their Javanese cognates.

Numerals 

Balinese has a decimal numeral system, but this is complicated by numerous words for intermediate quantities such as 45, 175, and 1600.

Grammar 

The word order is similar to that of Indonesian, and verb and noun inflectional morphology is similarly minimal.  However, derivational morphology is extensive, and suffixes are applied to indicate definite or indefinite articles, and optionally to indicate possession.

Writing
Balinese has been written in two different writing systems: the Balinese script, and in modern times the Latin script.

Balinese script

The earliest known inscriptions date from the 9th century AD.

Few people today are familiar with the Balinese script. The Balinese script is almost the same as the Javanese script.

Latin alphabet

Gallery

Note
 In Balinese script, Sanskrit and Kawi loanwords tend use conservative orthography as standard form in Balinese script. The word for language, basa, in Balinese is a loanword from Old Javanese  which came from the Sanskrit word  , hence it is written according to Sanskrit and Old Javanese spelling  in Balinese script. The  form in Balinese script is used by beginner writers. Meanwhile, diacritics are not written in the current romanization of the Balinese language.

See also 
 Balinese (Unicode block)

References

External links 

 Balinese man speaking Balinese language in different Balinese dialects
 
 The Balinese Digital Library.
 Widiadana R. A. & Erviani N. K. (29 January 2011). Ancient ‘lontar’ manuscripts go digital. The Jakarta Post.
 Erviani N. K. (14 January 2011). US scholar brings ancient Balinese scripts to digital age. The Jakarta Post.
 Unicode website
 Paradisec open access recording of Balinese song.
 Kaipuleohone's Blust collection includes materials on Balinese, including RB2-006,RB2-009.
 The Balinese Language (ᬩᬲᬩᬮᬶ) - YouTube

 
Languages attested from the 9th century
Bali–Sasak–Sumbawa languages
Subject–verb–object languages
Balinese culture